Skærbæk is a coastal town in Fredericia Municipality, Denmark, with a population of 2,290 (1 January 2022). It is situated on the northern shore of Kolding Fjord, 4 km south of the town of Taulov.

The Skærbækværket Power Station, owned and operated by Ørsted, is located just west of the town.

References 

Cities and towns in the Region of Southern Denmark
Fredericia Municipality